Parahancornia fasciculata is a flowering plant native to rainforest in South America. The latex from the tree is used in traditional medicine.

References

fasciculata
Trees of Peru